Kiki Bertens was the two-time defending champion, but lost in the quarterfinals to Kirsten Flipkens.

Johanna Larsson won her second WTA title, defeating Alison Riske in the final, 7–6(7–4), 6–4.

Seeds

Draw

Finals

Top half

Bottom half

Qualifying

Seeds

Qualifiers

First qualifier

Second qualifier

Third qualifier

Fourth qualifier

Fifth qualifier

Sixth qualifier

References
Main Draw
Qualifying Draw

Nürnberger Versicherungscup - Singles
2018 Singles